Società Sportiva Dilettantistica Settimo Calcio is an Italian association football club, based in Settimo Torinese, Piedmont.

History 
The club was founded in 1912.

Serie D 
In the season 2010–11, from Serie D group A it was relegated to Eccellenza Piedmont and Aosta Valley.

Colors and badge 
The team's colors are all-purple.

External links 
Tab team

Football clubs in Italy
Football clubs in Piedmont and Aosta Valley
Association football clubs established in 1912
1912 establishments in Italy
Settimo Torinese